Gibbula hisseyiana is a species of minute sea snail, a marine gastropod mollusk in the family Trochidae, the top snails.

Description
The size of the shell varies between 1.5 mm and 3 mm. The thin, ventricose shell is extremely minute. It has a globosely turbinate shape. The short spire is obtuse, and densely spirally striate. It is  whitish with angulately undulate olive streaks, which are often confluent. The olive markings vary into lines and deeply shaded spots. Sometimes the shell is uniformly olive, or even blue black. The five whorls are rounded. The aperture is orbiculate and entire. The acute, internal lip subreflexed. The columella is subperforate.

About 50 specimens were found in the stomach of a yellow-eye mullet, Aldrichetta forsteri  (Valenciennes, 1836)

Distribution
This species is endemic to Australia and occurs off Tasmania.

References

 Tenison-Woods, J.E. 1876. Description of new Tasmanian shells. Papers and Proceedings of the Royal Society of Tasmania 1875: 134-162

External links
 

hisseyiana
Gastropods of Australia
Gastropods described in 1876